The 2020 Korean FA Cup, known as Hana Bank FA Cup due to sponsorship agreement with Hana Bank, was the 25th edition of the Korean FA Cup. Suwon Samsung Bluewings were the defending champions. As a change from the previous year, U-League teams did not participate; instead, the top eleven sides from the K5 League gained qualification.

Jeonbuk Hyundai Motors won their fourth FA Cup title, and qualified for the 2021 AFC Champions League group stage.

Calendar

First round
The draw was held on 18 February 2020.

Bracket

Second round

Third round

Round of 16

Quarter-finals

Semi-finals

Final

First leg

Second leg

Jeonbuk Hyundai Motors won 3–2 on aggregate.

References

External links
Official FA Cup Page at KFA Website
Korean FA Cup, Soccerway.com
Operation Rule (in Korean) (Archived)

Korean FA Cup seasons
South Korea
Association football events postponed due to the COVID-19 pandemic